Available for Propaganda is the fourth studio album from the Italian nu metal band Linea 77. It was released on 15 November 2005 by Earache Records. The third track "Inno all'odio" featured in FIFA 06.

Track listing 
"Fist" - 3:06
"But I Thought Everything Was Alright" - 3:18
"Inno all'odio" (Anthem to Hatred) - 4:21
"Charon" - 3:12
"Sleepless" - 3:47
"Evoluzione" (Evolution) - 3:21
"Lost in a Videogame" - 4:45
"Rotten Mouth & Broken Arm" - 4:03
"Squeal" - 3:54
"A.D.H.D." - 3:04
"Therapia" (Therapy) - 3:37
"To Protect and Serve" - 4:08

Charts

References

2005 albums
Linea 77 albums
Italian-language albums
Earache Records albums